Phrom Khiri is a district (amphoe) of Nakhon Si Thammarat province, southern Thailand.

History
On 26 August 1974 the minor district (king amphoe) Phrom Khiri was formed with the three tambons Phrom Lok, Ban Ko, and In Khiri split from Mueang Nakhon Si Thammarat district. On 13 July 1981 it was upgraded to a full district.

Geography
Neighboring districts are (from the north clockwise): Nopphitam, Tha Sala, Mueang Nakhon Si Thammarat, Lan Saka, and Phipun.

Administration
The district is divided into five sub-districts (tambons), which are further subdivided into 39 villages (mubans). There are two townships (thesaban tambons): Phrom Lok covers parts of tambons Phrom Lok and Ban Ko, and Thon Hong part of the same-named tambon. Each tambon has its non-municipal areas administered by a tambon administrative organization (TAO).

References

External links
amphoe.com

Districts of Nakhon Si Thammarat province